Tito Luis Polo Gonzalez (born August 23, 1994) is a Colombian professional baseball outfielder in the Washington Nationals organization.

Career

Pittsburgh Pirates
Polo signed with the Pittsburgh Pirates as an international free agent in March 2012. He made his debut that same year with the DSL Pirates, and he spent the whole season there, slashing .280/.404/.394 with two home runs and 26 RBIs in 55 games. In 2013, he returned to the DSL Pirates and compiled a .275 batting average with two home runs, 16 RBIs, and 22 stolen bases in 45 games, and in 2014, he played for the GCL Pirates where he batted .291 with three home runs and 25 RBIs in 44 games. Polo spent 2015 with the West Virginia Power of the Class A South Atlantic League, where he batted .236 with three home runs, 26 RBIs, and 46 stolen bases in 102 games. He began 2016 back with West Virginia and was later promoted to the Bradenton Marauders of the Class A-Advanced Florida State League.

New York Yankees
The Pirates traded Polo, along with Stephen Tarpley, to the New York Yankees on August 30, 2016, as players to be named later for Iván Nova. New York assigned him to the Tampa Yankees of the FSL and he played in two games for them to finish the season. In 111 total games between West Virginia, Bradenton, and Tampa, he slashed .289/.359/.447 with 16 home runs, 66 RBIs, and 37 stolen bases.

In 2017, Polo began the season with Tampa and was promoted to the Trenton Thunder of the Class AA Eastern League in July.

Chicago White Sox
On July 18, 2017, the Yankees traded Polo, Tyler Clippard, Blake Rutherford, and Ian Clarkin to the Chicago White Sox for David Robertson, Todd Frazier, and Tommy Kahnle. The White Sox assigned him to the Birmingham Barons of the Class AA Southern League. Polo posted a combined .301 batting average with five home runs, 44 RBIs, 34 stolen bases, and an .805 OPS in 95 total games between Tampa, Trenton, and Birmingham. Polo played the entire 2018 season with Birmingham and elected free agency on November 2, 2018.

Seattle Mariners
On November 28, 2018, Polo signed a minor league deal with the Seattle Mariners.

He began the 2019 season with the Tacoma Rainiers of the Class AAA Pacific Coast League. Polo was released by the Mariners organization on April 19, 2019, after being suspended 25 games by the Pacific Coast League for spiking El Paso Chihuahuas first baseman Alex Dickerson during a game on April 17. Despite this Polo claimed it was an accident caused by running with his head down thus not allowing him to see Dickerson's foot.

Mexican League (2019–2022)
On June 6, 2019, Polo signed with the Acereros de Monclova of the Mexican League. On June 25, he was traded to the Rieleros de Aguascalientes. On July 25, 2019, Polo was released. After the 2020 season, he played for Colombia in the 2021 Caribbean Series. On April 17, 2021, Polo signed with the Generales de Durango. He batted a team-high .375/.451/.631 with 5 home runs and 16 RBIs in 45 games. He became a free agent following the season. On January 16, 2022, Polo signed with the Tigres de Quintana Roo.

Washington Nationals
On December 1, 2022, Polo signed a minor league contract with the Washington Nationals.

International career
Polo was selected to the roster for the Colombia national baseball team at the 2015 Pan American Games and 2017 World Baseball Classic.

In the 2017 WBC, he played in Colombia's first WBC victory. He was ejected along with Team Colombia's first baseman, Reynaldo Rodriguez and Bench Coach, Edgar Renteria for arguing a call.

References

External links

1994 births
Living people
Acereros de Monclova players
Águilas del Zulia players
Colombian expatriate baseball players in Venezuela
Arizona League White Sox players
Baseball players at the 2015 Pan American Games
Birmingham Barons players
Bradenton Marauders players
Colombian expatriate baseball players in Mexico
Colombian expatriate baseball players in the United States
Dominican Summer League Pirates players
Colombian expatriate baseball players in the Dominican Republic
Generales de Durango players
Glendale Desert Dogs players
Gulf Coast Pirates players
Mexican League baseball center fielders
National baseball team players
Pan American Games competitors for Colombia
People from Archipelago of San Andrés, Providencia and Santa Catalina
Rieleros de Aguascalientes players
Tacoma Rainiers players
Tampa Yankees players
Tigres de Quintana Roo players
Trenton Thunder players
Venados de Mazatlán players
West Virginia Power players
2017 World Baseball Classic players
Gigantes del Cibao players